Linoclostis is a genus of moths of the family Xyloryctidae.

Species
 Linoclostis brachyloga Meyrick, 1917
 Linoclostis gonatias Meyrick, 1908
 Linoclostis musicodes Meyrick, 1910

References

Xyloryctidae
Xyloryctidae genera